Örskär, is a Swedish island and lighthouse station located north of Gräsö on the Uppland coastline. A large part of the island is a nature reserve and it is rich of unusual flowers such as wild orchids. The island is also noted to be a good place for birding. A very small hostel exists on the island.

History 
Örskär was one of the first lightstations to be built in Sweden. The first lighthouse was constructed of wood in 1684, but was burned down in 1738 when it was hit by the lightning. The present tower was constructed by the royal architect Carl Hårleman. The flame in the lantern ran on colza oil lamps, and mirrors collected the light. Kerosene lamps replaced the colza oil lamps in the 1870s. It was finally electrified in 1954. Today the lighthouse is owned and remote-controlled by the Swedish Maritime Administration.

Climate 
Örskär has a humid continental climate (Dfb) with maritime influence. Its exterior position from the Swedish mainland renders in smaller seasonal variations than nearby locations. Although it is a maritime microclimate, it is more prone to extremes in temperatures than other outlying weather stations.

See also 

 List of lighthouses and lightvessels in Sweden

References

External links 
 
 Sjofartsverket  
 The Swedish Lighthouse Society
 Örskärs fyr 

Islands of Uppsala County
Buildings and structures in Uppsala County
Lighthouses in Sweden